Byadarahalli is a village in the Mandya district of Karnataka, India.

Location
Byadarahalli is located between Mysore and Bangalore.

Access
Byadarahalli has a railway station where only slow trains stop. Buses are available from Mandya.

Post office
There is a post office in the village with the pincode being 571434.

See also
 Mandya
 Naganahalli
 Pandavapura
 
 Yeliyur

References

Villages in Mandya district